Željko Vadić (born 27 March 1953) is a Croatian sports shooter. He competed in the mixed trap event at the 1992 Summer Olympics.

References

External links
 

1953 births
Living people
Croatian male sport shooters
Olympic shooters of Croatia
Shooters at the 1992 Summer Olympics
Sportspeople from Velika Gorica